Iði (also Idi) is a jötunn in Norse mythology. He is the son of Alvaldi and the brother of Þjazi and Gangr.

Name 
The Old Norse name Iði has been translated as the 'active one' or the 'hard-working one', deriving from ið ('work'; compare with Norwegian idig and Swedish idog 'hard-working').

Attestations 
In Skáldskaparmál (Language of Poetry), Iði is mentioned as the son of the jötunn Alvaldi, who is "very rich in gold", and as the brother of Þjazi and Gangr:

References

Bibliography 
 

 

Jötnar